"As It Was" is a song by British singer Harry Styles, released through Erskine and Columbia, on 1 April 2022 as the lead single from his third studio album, Harry's House (2022). The song was written by Styles alongside the song's producers Kid Harpoon and Tyler Johnson.

"As It Was" was widely acclaimed by music critics and entered at the top of the UK Singles Chart, becoming Styles's second number-one single after "Sign of the Times" in April 2017. "As It Was" spent ten weeks at the top of the UK Singles Chart, becoming the longest-running number-one and best-selling single of 2022 in his home country. It also became his second number one single in the US; the song spent 15 weeks atop the Billboard Hot 100, becoming the longest-running US number one by a UK act and the fourth-longest-running number one in the chart's history.

"As It Was" was a massive success worldwide topping the charts in 45 countries, including Australia, Austria, Belgium, Canada, Croatia, Denmark, France, Germany, Greece, Ireland, Lithuania, the Netherlands, New Zealand, Singapore and Sweden.

Background
Harry Styles announced the title of his third studio album as Harry's House on 23 March 2022, unveiling its artwork, a 40-second trailer and the album's release date as 20 May 2022. Five days later, he announced the title of its lead single as "As It Was", along with pictures of him in a "sequined, sleeveless red outfit" and its release date as 1 April 2022. Simultaneously, posters bearing the lyrics "It's not the same as it was" and a picture of Styles sitting on a big ball appeared in various cities. He released a teaser of the music video on 30 March, which included an "energetic drum beat" and a "sunny electric guitar riff", and depicted him in a red jumpsuit spinning in circles atop a motorised turntable.

Lyrics and composition 
Music critics described the song as a guitar-driven synth-pop track, a noticeable shift from Styles's pop rock-oriented sounds. Chris Willman of Variety noted that it takes heavy inspiration from Depeche Mode and a-ha, while also suggesting that it adopted a style similar to the Weeknd's 2019 single "Blinding Lights". EUPHORIA magazine felt that Styles was inspired by James Bay's 2018 single "Pink Lemonade", adding that the two songs sound "eerily similar". Lyrically, "As It Was" is rooted in personal transitions and depicts a feeling of loss and loneliness.

Critical reception

"As It Was" received critical acclaim. NMEs Rhian Daly gave the song five out of five stars, describing it as "not a million miles away from where Fine Line left off, but hardly retreading old ground." According to Daly, the track suggests Harry's House will solidify Styles "as one of the current pop landscapes' greats". Beau Beaumont-Thomas of The Guardian also rated the song five stars and called it "one of his very best", writing, "Many will pore over the gossipy, self-referential lyrics, but Styles's song is for everyone: an effervescent, high-tempo hit to have you clicking your heels." In his review for Rolling Stone, Rob Sheffield regarded "As It Was" as one of Styles's most "emotionally powerful" songs, calling it a "daring change-up" and a "straight-from-the-heart cry that's also an irresistible dance-floor challenge." Sahar Ghadirian of Clash magazine deemed it a "powerhouse" and Styles "at his most vulnerable". Ghadirian appreciated the "dream fusion" of synth-pop with electro rock and commented that the bells end the song on "a euphoric high". Thania Garcia of Variety magazine described the song as being "new wave-inspired".

Evening Standard reviewer Jochan Embley meanwhile found the track inferior to the singer's previous singles "Watermelon Sugar" and "Adore You", but wrote that Styles and his collaborators "still know how to make an instantly enjoyable tune". Olivia Horn of Pitchfork was less impressed and bemoaned that the song "winds down without any real payoff", citing the circuitousness of the lyrics as "a frequent shortcoming in Styles' songwriting."

Commercial performance
"As It Was" was an immediate success; it earned the Guinness World Records title for the most streamed track on Spotify within 24 hours by a male artist, and broke the Apple Music streaming record for most first-day streams for a 2022 release. The song also opened atop the Billboard Global 200 with the greatest global streaming week of 2022, becoming Styles's first number-one on the tally.

In the UK, "As It Was" became Styles's second solo number-one on the singles chart, debuting with the biggest sales and streaming weeks of any single in 2022. It spent ten weeks at number one on the UK singles chart, becoming the longest-running number one of the year in the UK. It became the most-streamed track  (149.6 million streams), most physically purchased (12,000 units), most digitally downloaded (47,000 units) and overall, best-selling (1.3 million equivalent units) track in the UK in 2022, .

"As It Was" entered at number one on the Billboard Hot 100, becoming Styles' second number-one single after "Watermelon Sugar" (2019). The song garnered the most single-day streams on Spotify in the United States, surpassing Olivia Rodrigo's "Drivers License" (2021). After the single's debut at No. 1, "As It Was" fell out of the No. 1 position and returned multiple times between April and September 2022; when it returned to No. 1 for the week ending 3 September 2022, it became the first song ever to have five separate runs in the top position. "As It Was" spent 15 weeks atop the Billboard Hot 100, becoming the longest-running US number one by a UK act, the longest-running No. 1 with no accompanying artists (i.e. a solo-billed song) and the fourth longest running number-one in the chart's history.

"As It Was" spent 18 weeks at number one on the Canadian Hot 100 and peaked at number one in Australia, Austria, Belgium, Croatia, Denmark, Germany, Greece, Ireland, Israel, Lithuania, the Netherlands, New Zealand, Slovakia, Sweden, and Switzerland.

"As It Was" ranked as the most popular song on Spotify and the second most popular song on Apple Music in 2022.

Music video
The music video for "As It Was" was released alongside the song. In the clip, Styles joins dancer Mathilde Lin on a turning platform and performs choreography by Yoann Bourgeois in the Barbican to release negative emotions. The video was filmed in London: apart from the Barbican Centre, it was also filmed at Lindley Hall near the Houses of Parliament, and the penguin pool at London Zoo. It was directed by Tanu Muino, who stated that directing for Styles was "a bucket list dream come true" but, on the second day of shooting, Muino's home country of Ukraine was invaded by Russia, rendering the process a "bittersweet" experience; nevertheless, Muino and her team from Ukraine "poured so much love into this video and you can see it on screen. It will be a music video I will never forget and now I can happily retire." (Nevertheless, Muino continued her filmmaking work afterwards). On YouTube, the video has received over 400 million views and 6.5 million likes as of January 2023.

Awards and nominations

Live performance 
Styles performed "As It Was" for the first time at the Coachella Valley Music and Arts Festival on 15 April and 22 April.

Credits and personnel
 Harry Styles – vocals, songwriting, bells
 Kid Harpoon – songwriting, production, bass, guitar, drum machine, drums, electric guitar, synthesizer
 Tyler Johnson – songwriting, production, drum machine, piano, synthesizer
 Doug Showalter – electric guitar, percussion
 Mitch Rowland – drums
 Jeremy Hatcher – programming, recording
 Randy Merrill – mastering
 Spike Stent – mixing
 Katie May – assistant engineering
 Luke Gibbs – assistant engineering
 Adele Phillips – assistant engineering
 Josh Caulder – assistant engineering
 Joe Dougherty – assistant engineering
 Matt Wolach – assistant engineering

Charts

Weekly charts

Monthly charts

Year-end charts

Certifications

Release history

See also

List of Billboard Hot 100 number ones of 2022
List of Billboard Global 200 number ones of 2022
List of Billboard Mainstream Top 40 number-one songs of 2022
List of Billboard Mexico Airplay number ones
List of Canadian Hot 100 number-one singles of 2022
List of Dutch Top 40 number-one singles of 2022
List of number-one hits of 2022 (Austria)
List of number-one hits of 2022 (Denmark)
List of number-one hits of 2022 (France)
List of number-one hits of 2022 (Germany)
List of number-one hits of 2022 (Switzerland)
List of number-one singles and albums in Sweden#2022
List of number-one singles from the 2020s (New Zealand)
List of number-one singles of 2022 (Australia)
List of number-one singles of 2022 (Ireland)
List of number-one singles of 2022 (Poland)
List of number-one songs of 2022 (Malaysia)
List of number-one songs of 2022 (Singapore)
List of Ultratop 50 number-one singles of 2022
List of UK Singles Chart number ones of the 2020s#2022
List of Billboard Hot 100 chart achievements and milestones

References

External links
 
 
 
 
 
 
 
 
 

2022 songs
2022 singles
Harry Styles songs
Songs written by Harry Styles
Songs written by Kid Harpoon
Songs written by Tyler Johnson (musician)
Song recordings produced by Kid Harpoon
Song recordings produced by Tyler Johnson (musician)
Billboard Global 200 number-one singles
Billboard Global Excl. U.S. number-one singles
Billboard Hot 100 number-one singles
British new wave songs
British synth-pop songs
Canadian Hot 100 number-one singles
Columbia Records singles
Dutch Top 40 number-one singles
Irish Singles Chart number-one singles
Music videos directed by Tanu Muino
Music videos shot in London
Number-one singles in Australia
Number-one singles in Austria
Number-one singles in Denmark
Number-one singles in Germany
Number-one singles in Greece
Number-one singles in India
Number-one singles in Israel
Number-one singles in Malaysia
Number-one singles in New Zealand
Number-one singles in Poland
Number-one singles in Romania
Number-one singles in Singapore
Number-one singles in Sweden
Number-one singles in Switzerland
SNEP Top Singles number-one singles
UK Singles Chart number-one singles
Ultratop 50 Singles (Flanders) number-one singles
Ultratop 50 Singles (Wallonia) number-one singles
Songs about loneliness